Todd Millstein is an American computer scientist. He is Professor of Computer Science and Chair of the Department at the UCLA Henry Samueli School of Engineering and Applied Science.

Millstein grew up in suburban Maryland, outside of Washington D.C. Millstein received his A.B from Brown University in 1996, where he was advised by Paris Kanellakis and Pascal Van Hentenryck. He attended the University of Washington for graduate studies, graduating with an M.Sc. and Ph.D in 2003. At UW, he was advised by Craig Chambers.

Millstein joined the faculty of the University of California, Los Angeles in 2003. He was appointed chair of the department in 2022, having previously served as vice chair for graduate studies.

References

External links 

 

Year of birth missing (living people)
American computer scientists
Scientists from Maryland
Brown University alumni
University of Washington alumni
University of California, Los Angeles faculty
Living people